When You See Yourself is the eighth studio album by American rock band Kings of Leon. It was released on March 5, 2021, by RCA Records. The album was again produced by Markus Dravs. It was preceded by the singles "The Bandit" and "100,000 People", both released on January 7, 2021. It is the band's first album in nearly four and a half years, following 2016's Walls, marking their longest gap between studio album releases.

Release and promotion
On March 31, 2020, the band released a live acoustic recording of its first new song in more than three years, "Going Nowhere"—later renamed "Supermarket"—through YouTube and various social media platforms.

On January 1, 2021, the band teased the song "The Bandit" on Instagram, and subsequently posted five more teasers of new songs. Six days later, the name of the album was announced and saw the release of its two lead singles: "The Bandit" and "100,000 People". The album itself was released on March 5.  

The band became the first to sell a newly-released album in the form of a non-fungible token, a type of cryptocurrency that contains unique assets such as music and art. The release came in the form of three different types of tokens for three separate packages in a series called "NFT Yourself". They contained a special album package, a live show package, and an audiovisual package. The tokens were developed and hosted by YellowHeart, a ticketing platform employing blockchain technology. The album was the first NFT to be displayed at the Rock & Roll Hall of Fame.

Critical reception

When You See Yourself has received generally positive reviews from critics. On Metacritic, the album has a weighted average score of 69 out of 100 based on 19 reviews, indicating "generally favorable reviews". AllMusic's Stephen Thomas Erlewine described the album "as a continuation of Walls" in a positive review, commenting that "the moody stateliness of When You See Yourself showcases their knack for building melodrama." Robin Murray of Clash praised the record for containing the band's "most tender and honest songwriting for a decade" and giving its fans "a certain intimacy" when they listen to it, writing that, "Subtle in its evolution, Kings Of Leon treat 'When You See Yourself' as a means to re-engage with their early bite, yet remain unwilling to cede their place at rock's top table." Pitchfork contributor Evan Rytlewski wrote that: "On their eighth album, the Followill brothers desperately cling to a sound that has stopped working, trying to write songs that soar but capable only of ones that wallow." Phil Mongredien of The Guardian felt that producer Dravs couldn't make use of the band's "raw material" to get them out of performing "wearyingly featureless mellow country rock", concluding that "this is the sound of a band fresh out of ideas."

Track listing

Personnel
Adapted from the booklet of When You See Yourself.

Kings of Leon
 Caleb Followill – guitar, vocals
 Matthew Followill – guitar, synthesiser , vocals
 Jared Followill – bass, acoustic guitar , vocals
 Nathan Followill – drums, percussion, vocals

Additional musicians
 Timothy Deaux – background vocals 
 Liam O'Neil – piano, organ , mellotron , acoustic guitar , background vocals 

Production
 Markus Dravs – production
 Iain Berryman – engineering
 Sean Badum – assistant engineer
 Mark "Spike" Stent – mixing
 Matt Wolach – assistant mix engineer
 Ted Jensen – mastering

Charts

Weekly charts

Year-end charts

References

2021 albums
Kings of Leon albums
RCA Records albums
Albums produced by Markus Dravs